Seattle Waldorf School is a private, Waldorf school serving grades preschool through 12 with an enrollment of 300 students. It was founded in 1980 and absorbed Hazel Wolf High School in 2007. The high school grades are located at Magnuson Park in Seattle's Sand Point neighborhood; two of the kindergarten classes are held in Wallingford; and the other kindergarten class, preschool, grades 1–8, and the administration are located in Meadowbrook.

Seattle Waldorf School is a Candidate Member School of the Pacific Northwest Association of Independent Schools (PNAIS) and a Member School of the Association of Waldorf Schools of North America (AWSNA).

Controversy

A news article published by the Seattle Times, based in data from the 2011–2012 school year, revealed that the Seattle Waldorf School held the highest vaccination exemption rate for schools in the Greater Seattle Area of 39.8 percent. 128 out of 130 exemptions were submitted by parents of students for non- medical or religious justifications.

See also
Waldorf education
Curriculum of the Waldorf schools

References

External links

Official web site

Educational institutions established in 1980
High schools in King County, Washington
Private high schools in Washington (state)
Schools in Seattle
Waldorf schools in the United States
Private middle schools in Washington (state)
Private elementary schools in Washington (state)